Tarfia Faizullah is a Bangladeshi American poet. Born in 1980, she was raised in West Texas. She traveled to Bangladesh in 2010 to interview survivors of rape by Pakistani soldiers during the 1971 Liberation War, the birangona. Seam (SIU, 2014), her first book, was a collection of poems that were inspired by the many interviews she had with the birangona; and won the Crab Orchard Series in Poetry Open Competition Awards Her writing has also appeared widely in media across the US and abroad and has appeared in many journalistic media such as BuzzFeed. In 2016, Harvard Law School included Faizullah in their list of 50 Women Inspiring Change

Life
Tarfia Faizullah is a Bengali American poet. Born in 1980 in Brooklyn, New York City; she was raised in Midland, Texas. She earned an MFA from the Virginia Commonwealth University program in creative writing. In 2006, after attending a poetry panel at the University of Texas at Austin which featured the Bengali author Mahmud Rahman. He had translated an excerpt of a novel, Talaash, by a writer named Shaheen Akhtar, which described the life of a woman who had been raped by Pakistani soldiers during the 1971 Liberation War. This historical event inspired her to begin researching the women affected by it. After applying and receiving a Fulbright scholarship, she traveled to Dhaka, Bangladesh, in 2010 to interview survivors of these atrocities, whom the Bengali government has dubbed birangona. Seam (SIU, 2014), her first book, was a collection of poems that were inspired by the many interviews she had with the birangona. Her second book, Registers of Illuminated Villages (Graywolf Press, 2018), was in development for 15 years and discusses many personal themes; it interrogates questions of memory, faith and locations beyond Bangladesh. Until 2019 she served at the University of Michigan's Helen Zell Writers’ Program as the Nicholas Delbanco Visiting Professor in Poetry. She currently she lives in Detroit and is an editor for the Asian American Literary Review and Organic Weapon Arts Chapbook Series.

Works
Seam, Southern Illinois University Press, 2014, 
Registers of Illuminated Villages: Poems, Gray Wolf Press, 2018,  

In Anthology
Ghost Fishing: An Eco-Justice Poetry Anthology, University of Georgia Press, 2018,  
Halal If You Hear Me Haymarket, 2019,

Awards
Associated Writers Program Intro Journals Award 
Dorothy Sargent Rosenberg Prize 
Copper Nickel Poetry Contest (2012) 
Bread Loaf Writers’ Conference Margaret Bridgman Scholarship in Poetry 
Sewanee Writers’ Conference scholarship 
Fulbright fellowship
 Three Pushcart Prizes 
'Ploughshares’ Cohen Award.
Crab Orchard Series in Poetry Open Competition Awards

References

External links

1980 births
Living people
21st-century American poets
21st-century American women writers
Virginia Commonwealth University alumni
Poets from Michigan
Poets from New York (state)
American women poets
University of Michigan faculty
Writers from Brooklyn
Writers from Detroit
American women academics